Oshikundu or Ontaku is a traditional Namibian drink made from fermented millet  (mahangu) flour, brans and malted sorghum flour mixed with lukewarm water.  It is made from cereal. Ontaku has short life span and it has to be consumed within the same day, preferably within 6 hours once its ready. Ontaku is more common among Aawambo people and in some part of Kavango Region. The knowledge of creating Ontaku has been passed orally from one generation to the other orally, hence existing through generations of Aawambo.   It is widely sold in open markets and mostly associated with rural areas and northern Namibia. Oshikundu can be served with porrige also when there is nothing to eat with porrige with it aid in term of in need of beef or soup.

A study carried out in 2001 by the Department of Food Science at the University of Namibia revealed that it was possible to produce a dry mix containing malted pearl millet and sorghum, that would be nutritionally enhanced with bambara nut. This mix could then be sold for making oshikundu. There are researcher who have done extensive research about this specific drinks from the University Of Namibia, Embashu Werner is one of those researcher who have contributed much to the research of this traditional brew.

The combination is left to ferment for several hours at room temperature. Once Oshikundu is ready to drink it becomes brown with a thick texture. It is nutritious and has a short shelf life, it is usually a home-brewed drink and it is enjoyed every day.

See also
Beer style

References

External links
The Owambo

Namibian cuisine
Namibian drinks
Namibian alcoholic drinks
Fermented drinks
Types of beer